Pilar Gómez Ferrer (7 February 1910 – 27 September 2009) was a Spanish actress. She appeared in more than one hundred films from 1952 to 1977.

Selected filmography

References

External links 

1910 births
2009 deaths
Spanish film actresses